Employee retention is the ability of an organization to retain its employees and ensure sustainability. Employee retention can be represented by a simple statistic (for example, a retention rate of 80% usually indicates that an organization kept 80% of its employees in a given period). Employee retention is also the strategies employers use to try to retain the employees in their workforce.

A distinction should be drawn between low-performing employees and top performers, and efforts to retain employees should be targeted at valuable, contributing employees. Employee turnover is a sign of deeper issues that have not been resolved, which may include low employee morale, absence of a clear career path, lack of recognition, poor employee-manager relationships or many other issues. A lack of job satisfaction and commitment to the organization can also cause an employee to withdraw and begin looking for other opportunities. Pay sometimes plays a smaller role in inducing turnover as is typically believed.

In a business setting, the goal of employers is usually to decrease employee turnover, thereby decreasing training costs, recruitment costs and loss of talent and of organisational knowledge. By implementing lessons learned from key organizational behavior concepts, employers can improve retention rates and decrease the associated costs of high turnover. Some employers seek "positive turnover" whereby they aim to maintain only those employees whom they consider to be high performers.

In today's environmental conscious behavior society, companies that are more responsible towards environment and sustainability practices can attract and retain employees. Employees like to be associated with companies that are environmentally friendly.

Cost of turnover
Studies have shown that cost related to directly replacing an employee can be as high as 50–60% of the employee's annual salary, but the total cost of turnover can reach as high as 90–200% of the employee's annual salary. These costs include candidate views, new hire training, the recruiter's salary, separation processing, job errors, lost sales, reduced morale and a number of other costs to the organization. Turnover also affects organizational performance. High-turnover industries such as retailing, food services, call centres, elder-care nurses, and salespeople make up almost a quarter of the United States population. Replacing workers in these industries is less expensive than in other, more stable, employment fields but costs can still reach over $500 per employee.

Herzberg's theory
An alternative motivation theory to Maslow's hierarchy of needs is the motivator-hygiene (Herzberg's) theory. The theories overlap, but the fundamental nature of each model differs. While Maslow's hierarchy implies the addition or removal of the same need stimuli will enhance or detract from the employee's satisfaction, Herzberg's findings indicate that factors garnering job satisfaction are separate from factors leading to poor job satisfaction and employee turnover. Herzberg's system of needs is segmented into motivators and hygiene factors. Like Maslow's hierarchy, motivators are often unexpected bonuses that foster the desire to excel. Hygiene factors include expected conditions that if missing will create dissatisfaction. Examples of hygiene factors include bathrooms, lighting, and the appropriate tools for a given job. Employers must utilize positive reinforcement methods while maintaining expected hygiene factors to maximize employee satisfaction and retention.

Retention programs
It is important to first pinpoint the root cause of the retention issue before implementing a program to address it. Once identified, a program can be tailored to meet the unique needs of the organization. A variety of programs exist to help increase employee retention.

Career Development – It is important for employees to understand their career path within an organization to motivate them to remain in the organization to achieve their personal career goals. Through surveys, discussion and classroom instruction, employees can better understand their goals for personal development. With these developmental goals in mind, organizations can – and should – offer tailored career development opportunities to their employees.

Executive Coaching – Executive coaching can be used to build competencies in leaders within an organization. Coaching can be useful in times of organizational change, to increase a leader's effectiveness or to encourage managers to implement coaching techniques with peers and direct reports. The coaching process begins with an assessment of the individual's strengths and opportunities for improvement. The issues are then prioritized and interventions are delivered to target key weaknesses.

Motivating Across Generations – Today's workforce includes a diverse population of employees from multiple generations. As each generation holds different expectations for the workplace, it is important to understand the differences between these generations regarding motivation and engagement. Managers, especially, must understand how to handle the differences among their direct reports.

Orientation and Onboarding – An employee's perception of an organization takes shape during the first several days on the job and continues throughout their first six months, with 90% of employees still deciding whether or not to stay in the organization during this time. It is in the best interest of both the employee and the organization to impart knowledge about the company quickly and effectively to integrate the new employee into the workforce. In addition, providing continual reinforced learning through extended onboarding over the first year can increase new hire retention by 25%. By implementing an effective onboarding process, new hire turnover rates will decrease and productivity will increase.

Women's Retention Programs – Programs such as mentoring, leadership development and networking that are geared specifically toward women can help retain top talent and decrease turnover costs. There are many Diversity, Equity, and Inclusion efforts that can contribute significantly to retaining women employees. By implementing programs to improve work/life balance, employees can be more engaged and productive while at work.

Employee Recognition Programs - Some of the biggest reasons for employee turnover are results of toxic company culture and not feeling engaged or recognized for their work. Companies have now started investing billions of dollars each year into bonus and employee perks programs. Forbes found in 2019 that companies that scored in the top 20% for building a ‘recognition-rich culture’ had 31% lower voluntary turnover rates.

Exit Interview and Separation Management Programs

Retention tools and resources

Employee Surveys – By surveying employees, organizations can gain insight into the motivation, engagement and satisfaction of their employees. It is important for organizations to understand the perspective of the employee in order to create programs targeting any particular issues that may impact employee retention.

Exit Interviews – By including exit interviews in the process of employee separation, organizations can gain valuable insight into the workplace experience. Exit interviews allow the organization to understand the triggers of the employee's desire to leave as well as the aspects of their work that they enjoyed. The organization can then use this information to make necessary changes to their company to retain top talent. Exit interviews must, however, ask the right questions and elicit honest responses from separating employees to be effective.

Employee Retention Consultants – An employee retention consultant can assist organizations in the process of retaining top employees. Consultants can provide expertise on how to best identify the issues within an organization that are related to turnover. Once identified, a consultant can suggest programs or organizational changes to address these issues and may also assist in the implementation of these programs or changes.

Join, stay, leave model

For organizations and employers, understanding the environment is the first step to developing a long-term retention strategy. Organizations should understand why employees join, why they stay and why they leave an organization. This join, stay, leave model is akin to a three-legged stool, meaning that without data on all three, organizations will be unsuccessful in implementing a proper retention strategy.

Why employees join –  The attractiveness of the position is usually what entices employees to join an organization. However, recruiting candidates is only half the problem while retaining employees is another. Understanding what your employees are looking for in the job while simultaneously making sure your expectations are correct are both important factors to address in the hiring process. High performing employees are more likely to be retained when they are given realistic job previews. Organizations that attempt to oversell the position or company are only contributing to their own detriment when employees experience a discord between the position and what they were initially told. To assess and maintain retention, employers should mitigate any immediate conflicts of misunderstanding in order to prolong the employee's longevity with the organization. New-hire surveys can help to identify the breakdowns in trust that occur early on when employees decide that the job was not necessarily what they envisioned.

Why employees stay – Understanding why employees stay with an organization is equally as important to understanding why employees choose to leave. Recent studies have suggested that as employees participate in their professional and community life, they develop a web of connections and relationships. These relationships prompt employees to become more embedded in their jobs and by leaving a job; this would sever or rearrange these social networks. The more embedded employees are in an organization, the more they are likely to stay. Additionally, the extent to which employees experience fit between themselves at their job, the lesser chance they will search elsewhere. Organizations can ascertain why employees stay by conducting stay interviews with top performers. A stay survey can help to take the pulse of an organization's current work environment and its impact on their high performing employees. Employers that are concerned with over-using stay interviews can achieve the same result by favoring an ongoing dialogue with employees and asking them critical questions pertaining to why they stay and what their goals are.

Why employees leave –  By understanding the reasons behind why employees leave, organizations can better cater to their existing workforce and influence these decisions in the future. Oftentimes, it is low satisfaction and commitment that initiates the withdrawal process, which includes thoughts of quitting in search of more attractive alternatives. If administered correctly, exit interviews can provide a great resource to why employees leave. Typically, employees are stock in their responses because they fear being reprimanded or jeopardizing any potential future reference. The most common reasons for why employees leave are better pay, better hours and better opportunity. These typical answers for leaving, often signal a much deeper issue that employers should investigate further into. By asking relevant questions and perhaps utilizing a neutral third party provider to conduct the interview, employers can obtain more accurate and quantifiable data. Contrary to what most organizations believe, employees often leave due to relationships with manager and/or treatment of employees and not compensation, as this is often a response that employees are uncomfortable expressing to their organization directly.   Retention Diagnostic is a rapid benchmarking process that identifies the costs and can help uncover what affects employee loyalty, performance and engagement.

Best practices

By focusing on the fundamentals, organizations can go a long way towards building a high-retention workplace. Organizations can start by defining their culture and identifying the types of individuals that would thrive in that environment. Organizations should adhere to the fundamental new hire orientation and on boarding plans. Attracting and recruiting top talent requires time, resources and capital. However, these are all wasted if employees are not positioned to succeed within the company. Research has shown that an employee's first 10 days are critical because the employee is still adjusting and getting acclimated to the organization. Companies retain good employees by being employers of choice.

Recruitment – Presenting applicants with realistic job previews during the recruitment process have a positive effect on retaining new hires. Employers that are transparent about the positive and negative aspects of the job, as well as the challenges and expectations are positioning themselves to recruit and retain stronger candidates.

Selection – There are plethora of selection tools that can help predict job performance and subsequently retention. These include both subjective and objective methods and while organizations are accustomed to using more subjective tools such as interviews, application and resume evaluations, objective methods are increasing in popularity. For example, utilizing biographical data during selection can be an effective technique. Biodata empirically identifies life experiences that differentiate those who stay with an organization and those who quit. Life experiences associated with employees may include tenure on previous jobs, education experiences, and involvement and leadership in related work experiences.

Socialization – Socialization practices delivered via a strategic onboarding and assimilation program can help new employees become embedded in the company and thus more likely to stay. Research has shown that socialization practices can help new hires become embedded in the company and thus more likely to stay. These practices include shared and individualized learning experiences, activities that allow people to get to know one another. Such practices may include providing employees with a role model, mentor or trainer or providing timely and adequate feedback.

Training and development – Providing ample training and development opportunities can discourage turnover by keeping employees satisfied and well-positioned for future growth opportunities. In fact, dissatisfaction with potential career development is one of the top three reasons employees (35%) often feel inclined to look elsewhere. if employees are not given opportunities to continually update their skills, they are more likely to leave. Those who receive more training are less likely to quit than those who receive little or no training. Employers that fear providing training will make their employees more marketable and thus increase turnover can offer job specific training, which is less transferable to other contexts. Additionally, employers can increase retention through development opportunities such as allowing employees to further their education and reimbursing tuition for employees who remain with the company for a specified amount of time.

Compensation and rewards – Pay levels and satisfaction are only modest predictors of an employee's decision to leave the organization; however organizations can lead the market with a strong compensation and reward package as 53% of employees often look elsewhere because of poor compensation and benefits. Organizations can explicitly link rewards to retention (i.e. vacation hours to seniority, offer retention Bonus payments or Employee stock options, or define benefit plan payouts to years of services) Research has shown that defined compensation and rewards as associated with longer tenure. Additionally, organizations can also look to intrinsic rewards such as increased decision-making autonomy.

Effective leaders – An employee's relationship with his/her immediately ranking supervisor or manager is equally important to keeping to making an employee feel embedded and valued within the organization. Supervisors need to know how to motivate their employees and reduce cost while building loyalty in their key people. Managers need to reinforce employee productivity and open communication, to coach employees and provide meaningful feedback and inspire employees to work as an effective team. In order to achieve this, organizations need to prepare managers and supervisors to lead and develop effective relationships with their subordinates. Executive Coaching can help increase an individual's effectiveness as a leader as well as boast a climate of learning, trust and teamwork in an organization. to encourage supervisors to focus on retention among their teams, organizations can incorporate a retention metric into their organization's evaluation.

Employee engagement – Employees who are satisfied with their jobs, enjoy their work and the organization, believe their job to be more important, take pride in the company and feel their contributions are impactful are five times less likely to quit than employees who were not engaged. Engaged employees give their companies crucial competitive advantages, including higher productivity and lower employee turnover.

Employee benefits - Benefits are a critical piece of the equation in retaining employees. Employees are looking for benefits that span more than the core basics. With a robust rewards and benefits package and an effective benefits communication plan, employee engagement and retention can improve. Nurturing your employees understanding of the total value of their benefits package and how to strategically use it will enhance their experience and total well-being.

Outsourcing employee retention program

Turnover costs can have significant negative impact on a company's performance. Turnover cost can represent more than 12 percent of pre-tax income for the average company and nearly 40 percent for companies at the 75th percentile for turnover rate. Organizations and managers understand the importance of implementing an effective retention program but aren't proactive in implementing one and often leave it for another day. That day hardly ever comes. Organizations that don't have the time or have limited resources can outsource employee retention programs to specialists. Companies can hire third party specialists to pinpoint the root causes of their workforce challenges. By identifying the root causes, customized action plans can be tailored to fit your organization's need to and create a retention program customized to your organization. Another benefit of outsourcing is that organizations can get quantifiable justifying the actions needed to improve their organization.

References

Human resource management
Employee relations